Þórðr is a given name. Notable people with the name include:

Þórðr Kolbeinsson, 11th century Icelandic skald
Þórðr Sjáreksson, 11th century Icelandic skald
Þórðr Sturluson, brother of Snorri Sturluson

Icelandic masculine given names